Public artworks on display in Prague include:

 Babies (Černý)
 Bust of Václav Štulc
 Ctirad and Šárka
 František Palacký Monument, Prague
 Head of Franz Kafka
 Holy Trinity Column, Malá Strana
 Jan Hus Memorial
 Josef Dobrovský Monument
 Kohl's Fountain
 Kranner's Fountain
 Libuše and Přemysl
 Lumír and Píseň
 Marian column Old Town Square
 Memorial to the Victims of Communism
 Obelisk (Prague Castle)
 Piss (Černý)
 Polibek (Petřín)
 Réva
 Slavín
 Stalin Monument (Prague)
 Statue of Alois Jirásek, Prague
 Statue of Bedřich Smetana, Prague
 Statue of Charles IV, Křižovnické Square
 Statue of Franz Kafka
 Statue of Jan Neruda, Prague
 Statue of Jaroslav Hašek
 Statue of John of Nepomuk, Vyšehrad
 Statue of John the Baptist, Maltézské Square
 Statue of Josef Jungmann
 Statue of Judah Loew ben Bezalel
 Statue of Karel Havlíček Borovský, Prague
 Statue of Mikuláš Karlach
 Statue of Milan Rastislav Štefánik, Prague
 Statue of Saint George, Prague Castle
 Statue of Saint Joseph, Charles Square
 Statue of Saint Procopius (Vyšehrad)
 Statue of Saint Sebastian (Vyšehrad)
 Statue of Saint Wenceslas (Bendl)
 Statue of Saint Wenceslas (Vosmík)
 Statue of Saint Wenceslas, Wenceslas Square
 Statue of Taras Shevchenko, Smíchov
 Statue of Tomáš Garrigue Masaryk, Prague
 Trigae (National Theatre)
 Vítězslav Hálek Memorial
 Wimmer's Fountain
 Winged Lion Memorial
 Woodrow Wilson Monument
 Wrestling Titans
 Youth
 Záboj and Slavoj
 Znovuzrození

Charles Bridge

Statues on Charles Bridge include:

 Calvary, Charles Bridge
 Statue of Adalbert of Prague, Charles Bridge
 Statue of Anthony of Padua, Charles Bridge
 Statue of Augustine of Hippo, Charles Bridge
 Statue of Bruncvík, Charles Bridge
 Statue of Francis Borgia, Charles Bridge
 Statue of Francis of Assisi, Charles Bridge
 Statue of Francis Xavier, Charles Bridge
 Statue of Ivo of Kermartin, Charles Bridge
 Statue of John of Nepomuk, Charles Bridge
 Statue of John the Baptist, Charles Bridge
 Statue of Jude the Apostle, Charles Bridge
 Statue of Lutgardis, Charles Bridge
 Statue of Nicholas of Tolentino, Charles Bridge
 Statue of Philip Benizi de Damiani, Charles Bridge
 Statue of Pietà, Charles Bridge
 Statue of Saint Anne, Charles Bridge
 Statue of Saint Cajetan, Charles Bridge
 Statue of Saint Christopher, Charles Bridge
 Statue of Saint Joseph, Charles Bridge
 Statue of Saint Ludmila, Charles Bridge
 Statue of Vitus, Charles Bridge
 Statue of Wenceslaus I, Charles Bridge
 Statues of John of Matha, Felix of Valois and Saint Ivan, Charles Bridge
 Statues of Madonna and Saint Bernard, Charles Bridge
 Statues of Madonna, Saint Dominic and Thomas Aquinas, Charles Bridge
 Statues of Saints Barbara, Margaret and Elizabeth, Charles Bridge
 Statues of Saints Cosmas and Damian, Charles Bridge
 Statues of Saints Cyril and Methodius, Charles Bridge
 Statues of Saints Norbert, Wenceslaus and Sigismund
 Statues of Saints Vincent Ferrer and Procopius, Charles Bridge

Culture in Prague
Prague
Public art